Bovey railway station sometimes known as Bovey for Ilsington was on the Moretonhampstead and South Devon Railway at Bovey Tracey, Devon, England.

The station was built on the west side of the town, opening on 4 July 1866. Two platforms were provided, with the main building and goods shed being on the town side of the line.

The station closed to passengers after the last train on 28 February 1959, with goods trains continuing until 6 July 1970.

Some of the line is now a road by-pass carrying the A382 road, but a short distance to the north the road diverges and the line is now a woodland walk through the Parke estate, owned by The National Trust. The station building still stands adjacent to the by-pass and is used as the Bovey Tracey Heritage Trust Centre. The goods shed is used as a store by the Dartmoor National Park Authority.

References
Notes

Sources

Disused railway stations in Devon
Railway stations in Great Britain opened in 1866
Railway stations in Great Britain closed in 1959
Former Great Western Railway stations
1866 establishments in England
Bovey Tracey